Whangaroa County was one of the counties of New Zealand on the North Island. In 1989 it became part of the Far North District Council when amalgamated with the Mangonui, Hokianga and Bay of Islands counties, and the Kaitaia and Kaikohe boroughs.

See also 
 List of former territorial authorities in New Zealand § Counties

Counties of New Zealand
Politics of the Northland Region